The Seal of the State of Alaska was first adopted before statehood, when the area was known as the District of Alaska. The first governor designated a seal of the district which featured glaciers, northern lights, igloos and an Inuit person ice fishing.

In 1910, this seal was replaced with a design more representative of the state's industrial and natural wealth. Today's seal contains rays above the mountains that represent the Alaskan northern lights. The smelter symbolizes mining, the train stands for Alaska's railroads and ships denote transportation by sea. The trees pictured in the seal symbolize the state's wealth of timber, and the farmer, his horse and the three shocks of wheat stand for Alaskan agriculture. The fish and the seals signify the importance of fishing and seal rookeries to Alaska's economy.

References

See also

List of Alaska state symbols
Flag of Alaska

Alaska
Symbols of Alaska
Alaska
Alaska
Alaska
Alaska
Alaska
Alaska
Alaska